Norman Chan Tak-lam, GBS, JP (born 1954), is a Hong Kong banker, treasury official, and civil servant. Chan was Chief Executive of the Hong Kong Monetary Authority from 2009 to 2019. He previously served as Director of the Office of the Chief Executive of the HKSAR and Regional Vice-Chairman of Standard Chartered Bank.

Career
Norman Chan graduated from Queen's College, Hong Kong, and then earned a degree in sociology at the Chinese University of Hong Kong. In 1976 Chan entered the Hong Kong Civil Service as an Administrative Officer. By 1991 he was appointed a Deputy Director of Monetary Management at the Exchange Fund of Hong Kong. At the creation of the Hong Kong Monetary Authority (HKMA) in 1993, Chan was named an Executive Director, and later took the role of vice president. In December 2005, he became the Vice-Chairman of the Asian region of Standard Chartered Bank. In July 2007, he was appointed as Director of the Office of the Hong Kong Chief Executive.

In July 2009, Financial Secretary John Tsang named Chan to the role of HKMA Chief Executive, from 1 October that year, on the retirement of Joseph Yam. Chan was compensated with an annual base salary of HK$6 million. With his reappointment in 2014, Chan served as Chief Executive for exactly ten years, stepping down from the role in a pre-announced move on 1 October 2019.

Within weeks, he was reportedly in consideration for the role of Chief Executive of Hong Kong, as news leaked of Carrie Lam's imminent removal from the post.

Political comment
In 2014, he and his HKMA predecessor Joseph Yam said that Occupy (the 2014 Hong Kong protests, aka the Umbrella Movement) could threaten city's economic growth.

Office 
In June 2020, Chan and his wife, through their company Citirich (Hong Kong) Limited bought a 1,040 square foot office on the 10th floor of the Kam Chung Commercial Building on Hennessy Road in Wan Chai. The office was purchased for HK$10.8 million without a mortgage.

References

External links
HKMA profile

Living people
1954 births
Government officials of Hong Kong
Alumni of the Chinese University of Hong Kong
Central bankers
Hong Kong chief executives
Hong Kong financial businesspeople
Alumni of Queen's College, Hong Kong